Azara lanceolata (lanceleaf azara; "corcolen", "aromo" in Spanish) is a species of flowering plant in the family Salicaceae (it was previously categorized as Flacourtiaceae). It has been named after its lance-shaped, serrated, glossy, bright green leaves. It is an evergreen shrub, growing to a height of 3–5 meters. It is found on both sides of the Andes mountains, in the south of Argentina and Chile.

Gallery

References

External links
 
 
 

Salicaceae
Taxa named by Joseph Dalton Hooker